The 2001 World Women's Handball Championship, the 15th of its kind, was held from 4 to 16 December 2001, and was hosted by Italy, with the final being played in Merano.

Qualification

Results

Preliminary round

Group A

Group B

Group C

Group D

Knockout round

Bracket

Round of 16

Quarterfinals

5–8th place semifinals

Semifinals

Seventh place game

Fifth place game

Third place game

Final

Final standings

Statistics

Top goalscorers

Source: IHF

Top goalkeepers 

Source: IHF

Medalists

References

Weblinks
 Official Website (Archived)
 International Handball Federation
 WC2001 at todor66
 Squads

W
W
World Handball Championship tournaments
W
Women's handball in Italy
December 2001 sports events in Europe
Merano
Sport in Bolzano
Brixen
Trento